Parndorf Plain also called Parndorf Heath in the northern part of Burgenland, Austria, at an altitude of 160–180 m, area approx. , with terraced gravel deposited by the River Danube during the Ice Age, situated between Lake Neusiedl and the Leitha Mountains in the southwest and Lower Leitha in the northeast. An almost treeless plain, it is about  higher than its surroundings, without any rivers or streams. Partly heath land with Pannonian flora and partly arable land. Wine growing on the steep loess slopes facing Lake Neusiedl. All towns are situated at the foot of the scarps. Large-scale dairy farming. 

The East railway line and the A4 autobahn (opened in Autumn 1994) run through the Parndorf plain. Draw-wells give the landscape a puszta character; Roman roads.

Parndorf Plain is among the windiest areas in inland Europe. The almost continuous reign of the north-easterly wind is occasionally interrupted by a gusty south-easterly. On the plain of the Parndorfer Platte the biggest modern wind farms in Austria have been set up.

See also 

 Parndorf, Zurndorf, Nickelsdorf, Rohrau, Potzneusiedl, Gattendorf
 Heide·boden (area of Deutsch Jahrndorf)
 Leithagebirge
 See·winkel
 
 Vienna Basin
 Little Alföld, (Great-) Alföld, Puszta, Pannonian Basin
 Győr-Moson-Sopron County
 Sziget·köz

Landforms of Burgenland
Neusiedl am See District
Plains of Austria